Wonsevu is an unincorporated community in southwest Chase County, Kansas, United States.

History

Early history

For many millennia, the Great Plains of North America was inhabited by nomadic Native Americans.  From the 16th century to 18th century, the Kingdom of France claimed ownership of large parts of North America.  In 1762, after the French and Indian War, France secretly ceded New France to Spain, per the Treaty of Fontainebleau.

19th century
In 1802, Spain returned most of the land to France.  In 1803, most of the land for modern day Kansas was acquired by the United States from France as part of the 828,000 square mile Louisiana Purchase for 2.83 cents per acre.

In 1854, the Kansas Territory was organized, then in 1861 Kansas became the 34th U.S. state.  In 1859, Chase County was established within the Kansas Territory, which included the land for modern day Wonsevu.

A post office existed in Wonsevu from August 23, 1875 to October 15, 1907.

21st century
The town today is almost a ghost town, with only a vacant church, school, two vacant houses, and several ruins left.

Geography
Wonsevu is located at  (38.1508506, -96.7722418), in the scenic Flint Hills of the Great Plains.

Climate
The climate in this area is characterized by hot, humid summers and generally mild to cool winters.  According to the Köppen Climate Classification system, Wonsevu has a humid subtropical climate, abbreviated "Cfa" on climate maps.

Education

Wonsevu is served by Peabody–Burns USD 398 public school district.  All students attend schools in Peabody at two schools:
 Peabody-Burns Junior/Senior High School, located in Peabody.
 Peabody-Burns Elementary School, located in Peabody.

Media

Print
 Peabody Gazette-Bulletin, local newspaper for Burns, Florence, Peabody.
 The El Dorado Times, regional newspaper from El Dorado.
 The Newton Kansan, regional newspaper from Newton.

Infrastructure

Utilities
 Internet
 Satellite Internet is provided by HughesNet, StarBand, WildBlue.
 TV
 Satellite TV is provided by DirecTV, Dish Network.
 Free over-the-air ATSC digital TV.

See also
 Cedar Township, Chase County, Kansas

References

Further reading

External links
 Peabody Gazette-Bulletin, newspaper
 Chase County maps: Current, Historic, KDOT
 Topo Map of Wonsevu area, USGS

Unincorporated communities in Kansas
Unincorporated communities in Chase County, Kansas